Encyclia advena is a species of epiphytic orchid, native to Atlantic forests in Brazil.

Description
The orchid species is a medium-sized, hot to warm growing, epiphytic species, with conic-elongate pseudobulbs carrying 1 to 2, apical, coriaceous, narrowly lanceolate leaves and flowers in the Brazilian spring (December to March). Because of its first flowering time, in December, the orchid is also named als "The Advent Encyclia". Which is immediately an explanation for the naming of the orchid.

Encyclia advena has olive or yellow petals and sepals with brown or maroon veins. Sometimes there are flushes of maroon on the petals. The lip is white and has some purple veins. The flower form is cupped and the petals are fleshy. The inflorescence is branched and up to four times taller than the foliage.

Distribution and habitat
Encyclia adenocaula grows in the eastern Atlantic rainforests of Brazil at elevations of 200 to 800 meters as a medium sized, hot to warm growing epiphyte with conic-elongate pseudobulbs.

References

External links
 
 
 Kew
 Orchidroots.org
 OrchidSpecies.com

advena
advena
Endemic orchids of Brazil
Flora of South America
Flora of Brazil
Orchids of South America
Orchids of Brazil
Plants described in 1935